The Floating College is a 1928 American silent comedy film directed by George Crone and starring Sally O'Neil, William Collier Jr. and Georgia Hale. Two sisters fall in love with a swimming instructor.

Cast
 Sally O'Neil as Pat Bixby 
 William Collier Jr. as George Dewey 
 Georgia Hale as Frances Bixby 
 Harvey Clark as The Dean 
 George Harris as Snug 
E.J. Ratcliffe as Nathan Bixby
 Virginia Sale as Miss Cobbs

References

External links
 

1928 films
1928 comedy films
1920s English-language films
American silent feature films
Silent American comedy films
American black-and-white films
Tiffany Pictures films
Films directed by George Crone
Seafaring films
1920s American films
Silent adventure films